The Sulawesi yellow bat (Scotophilus celebensis) is a species of vesper bat. It is found only in Indonesia.

References

Scotophilus
Bats of Indonesia
Bat, Sulawesi yellow
Mammals of Sulawesi
Taxonomy articles created by Polbot
Mammals described in 1928